Friends is the third studio album from Anthony Neely. The album was available for pre-order on 28 September 2013 and was released on 8 October. Its lead single is "Everything is Because of Love" and its second lead single is "I am Your ..."

Tracklisting

Edition 
Standard Version

MVs

Chart performance

References 

Anthony Neely albums
2013 albums